Hatchett is a surname. Notable people with the surname include:

Bo Hatchett, American politician
Charles Hatchett FRS (1765–1847), English chemist who discovered the element niobium
Derrick Hatchett (born 1958), former member of the Baltimore Colts from 1980 to 1983
Ed Hatchett, American attorney and politician from Glasgow, Kentucky
Glenda Hatchett (born 1951), the former star of the television show, Judge Hatchett
Joseph W. Hatchett (1932–2021), American judge and attorney; the first black man elected to the Florida Supreme Court
Lewis Hatchett (born 1990), English cricketer
Marion J. Hatchett (1927–2009), Episcopal priest, scholar, and one of the primary liturgists who shaped the 1979 Book of Common Prayer
Matt Hatchett (born 1966), American businessman and politician
Richard Hatchett, American epidemiologist
Rufus Hatchett (born 1888), American baseball player
Seb Feszczur-Hatchett (born 1995), English cricketer
William Hatchett, companion of English writer, actress and publisher Eliza Haywood (1693–1756)

See also
Judge Hatchett, nationally syndicated American television program produced and distributed by Sony Pictures Television Distribution
Hatchet
Hatchet II
Hatchet man (disambiguation)